Deborah Reber is a young adult fiction and non-fiction writer. She previously worked in children's television. She is the author of several books, including the recently published In Their Shoes. She also contributes to the teen self-help series Chicken Soup for the Teenage Soul: The Real Deal. Deborah lives with her husband and son in Seattle, Washington.

Bibliography
 Chill, 2008, 
 In Their Shoes, 2007, 
 It's My Life: The Guide to Friendship, 2007, 
 Chicken Soup for the Teenage Soul: The Real Deal Challenges: Stories about Disses, Losses, Messes, Stresses & More, 2006
 Chicken Soup for the Teenage Soul: The Real Deal Friends, 2005
 Run for Your Life: A Book for Beginning Women Runners, 2005
 Chicken Soup for the Teenage Soul : The Real Deal School, 2005
 Blue un día de lluvia (Blue's Best Rainy Day), 2005, 
 Blue en busca de huevos (Blue's Egg Hunt), 2004, 
 Bold Ink, 2003, 
 Blue’s Clues: Magenta Gets Glasses, 2002, 
 Blue’s Clues: ABC Detective Game, 2002, 
 Blue’s Clues: Guess Who Loves Blue!, 2002, 
 Blue’s Clues: My Pet Turtle, 2001, 
 Blue’s Clues: Blue’s Egg Hunt, 2001, 
 Blue’s Clues: My Favorite Letters, 2001, 
 Blue’s Clues: Blue’s Best Rainy Day, 2000, 
 Blue’s Clues: Magenta and Me, 2000, 
 Blue’s Clues: Blue’s Valentine’s Day, 2000, 
 Blue’s Clues: Weather Games with Blue, 1999,

References

External links
 Official author website

American television writers
Year of birth missing (living people)
Living people
American children's writers
American women children's writers
American women television writers
21st-century American women